Michael Roche may refer to:

Michael Joseph Roche (1878–1964), U.S. federal judge
Michael Augustine Roche (1849–1915), Irish politician
Mick Roche (1943–2016), Irish hurler
Michael Roche (boxer), Irish boxer

See also
Michael Roach (disambiguation)
Mike Roche, American actor
Mike Roche (athlete), American middle-distance runner